Louis the Junker of Hesse (1305 – 2 February 1345) was a German nobleman.  He was the third son of  Landgrave Otto I of Hesse and his wife Adelheid, a daughter of Otto III of Ravensberg.

Life 
In 1326, Otto I and his wife visited Pope John XXII in Avignon with a large retinue.  During that visit, John XXII promised that Louis would receive a prebendary.  However, Louis refused to remain celibate, and renounced his ecclesiastical career.

In 1328, his father died and his elder brother Henry II inherited the Landgraviate.  Louis received an apanage, consisting of castle and district of Grebenstein.

Louis died in 1345.  His brother Henry II decided in 1367, after his own son Otto had died in the spring, to adopt Louis's son Herman II as his co-ruler and heir.

Marriage and issue 
On 15 October 1340, Louis married Elisabeth (or Elise), a daughter of Count Simon II of Sponheim-Kreuznach.  She was the widow of the Swabian Count Rudolph I of Hohenberg, who had died in 1336.  Louis and Elisabeth had three children:
 Otto (1341-1357).  He was destined for an ecclesiastical career and was educated in Magdeburg, where he became a canon and intended to succeed his uncle Otto as Archbishop.  However, he died young.  Allegedly, he was poisoned by abbot Henry VII of Fulda Abbey.
 Herman II, nicknamed "the Learned" ( – 1413), succeeded his uncle Henry II, Landgrave of Hesse as Landgrave of Hesse
 Agnes ( – 25 December 1394), was abbess of the Cistercian monastery St. Catherine in Eisenach, where she died

References 
 Eckhart G. Franz: Das Haus Hessen, Kohlhammer Verlag: Urban, Stuttgart, 2005, p. 23–25

House of Hesse
1305 births
1345 deaths
14th-century German nobility